Lalandia is the name of two Danish holiday resorts owned by Parken Sport & Entertainment. The original Lalandia Rødby is located in Rødbyhavn, and based on successful experiences from Rødbyhavn,
Lalandia opened a new tropical holiday and activity centre in Billund in April 2009.

Lalandia Rødby
Lalandia Rødby mainly consists of a giant indoor water-fun-land, with four body slides and a wild river. The Aquadome is the major focal point of Lalandia and
is full of children and adults all enjoying the many water activities in 7,400 m² of heated pools with the many watery activities. There are three large indoor pools, offering plenty of space for swimming, water games and
entertainment. One of the pools, the Wave Pool, produces waves once an hour for the enjoyment of bathers. Other activities include: soccer, indoor skating, miniature golf, badminton, tennis and other sport activities. In July 2013, the Aquadome Lalandia Rødby was listed as Denmark's tenth most popular attraction with 512,000 visitors in 2012. Lalandia Billund came in sixth with 620,000 visitors.

History
Lalandia Rødby was established in 1988 in Rødby. Since the establishment it has been expanded several times with more vacation houses. Lalandia is named after the island of Lolland in Denmark on which it is situated.

Lalandia Billund
Lalandia Billund opened on 24 April 2009. The Lalandia Aquadome in Billund is Scandinavia's largest waterpark measuring 10,000 m². The water slides include "Tornado" that uses 4-person dinghys, head-first racing "Octopus Racers" and 102-metre "Twister".

References

External links 
Official homepage

Tourist attractions in the Region of Southern Denmark
Billund Municipality